EHC Chur Capricorns (formerly EHC Chur Sport AG) is a Swiss ice hockey team based in Chur, Switzerland who played until 2008 in National League B. They currently compete in the third tiered MyHockey League.

Honors
 National League B Champions 1998–99, 1999–00 
Swiss Regio Champions 2002–03

Players

Notable alumni

Ken Baumgartner
Renato Tosio
Thomas Vrabec
Harijs Vītoliņš
David Aebischer
Marco Bührer
Tobias Stephan
Wes Walz 
Nino Niederreiter
Paul DiPietro
Mika Strömberg
Leonīds Tambijevs
Mauro Jörg
Edgar Salis
Dino Kessler

References

External links
EHC Chur official website

Ice hockey clubs established in 1933
Ice hockey teams in Switzerland